Claudio Della Penna (born 12 May 1989 in Rome), is an Italian football striker.

Career
He began to play in the youth system of AS Roma, he was in the team that finished runners-up in the Torneo di Viareggio 2007.He was among the youngest players in A.S Roma
 
He made his first appearance with the senior squad on 19 December 2007 in the Coppa Italia 2007–08 match lost against Torino F.C., when he substituted Adrian Piţ.

He spent the 2008–09 season on loan to Lega Pro Prima Divisione side Pistoiese.

After his return from Pistoiese, AS Roma decided not to include Della Penna into the first team, thus making him unavailable to play any competitive game at all, since he also cannot be featured any longer with the Primavera side due to age limits, and his contract is due to expire in June 2010. Despite this, he is still part of the Italian under-20 national team plans, and he was  part of the azzurri roster for the 2009 FIFA U-20 World Cup.

In January 2010, He was loan to Gallipoli Calcio from AS Roma, he agreed for a loan move to Serie B outfit Gallipoli for the remainder of the 2009–10 season.

On 31 August 2010 he moved to Lega Pro Prima Divisione side Ternana in co-ownership deal.

References

1989 births
Living people
Italian footballers
Italy youth international footballers
Serie B players
Serie C players
A.S. Roma players
U.S. Pistoiese 1921 players
A.S.D. Gallipoli Football 1909 players
Ternana Calcio players
Association football forwards
Footballers from Rome
Association football midfielders
Mediterranean Games silver medalists for Italy
Mediterranean Games medalists in football
Competitors at the 2009 Mediterranean Games